Abdyl Aziz Vehbi Agolli mostly known as Haxhi Vehbi Dibra (12 March 1867 – 24 March 1937) was an Albanian mufti, theologian, politician  and a delegate of Dibër at the Albanian Declaration of Independence. He was elected as chairman of the Elderly Assembly, the precursor to what is today the Parliament of Albania and the first Grand Mufti of the Muslim Community of Albania from 1920 to 1929. Vehbi Dibra will also be remembered as the main organizer of the Congress of Dibra.

Life 
Vehbi Agolli was born in the city of Debar on 12 March 1867 to Ahmed Effendi Agolli, mufti of Upper Debre. He studied Islamic theology, law and philosophy and was appointed mufti of Dibër. In 1909, he was elected chairman of the Congress of Dibër, a precursor assembly of the Albanian Revolt of 1910. In November 1912, he participated as a delegate of Dibër in the Assembly of Vlorë, in which the independence of Albania was declared and a national congress was formed. The deputies of the national congress also elected eighteen delegates of the assembly to form the Albanian Senate, of which Vehbi Dibra was the first chairman.

In order to favourably influence the part of the Sunni community that based its view towards the declaration of independence of Albania on the clergy, he presented a fatwā and saluted the declaration as God's gift. A member of the reformist faction of the Sunni community of Albania, in 1920 he was elected to head it as Grand Mufti. During his tenure which lasted until 1929, the waqf properties were documented and registered, the administration was centralized and the religious services reached normalization. Dibra also began the publication of the weekly journal Zani i Naltë and introduced the use of Albanian in religious ceremonies.

References

19th-century Albanian politicians
20th-century Albanian politicians
Grand Muftis of Albania
Signatories of the Albanian Declaration of Independence
1867 births
1937 deaths
Albanian publishers (people)
People from Debar
People from Scutari vilayet
People from Manastir vilayet
All-Albanian Congress delegates
Congress of Dibër delegates